Alfred Plé (9 January 1888 – 4 March 1980) was a French rower who had his best results in the double sculls, together with Gaston Giran. In 1920 they won the European title and a bronze Olympic medal.

References

External links

 
 
 
 

1888 births
1980 deaths
French male rowers
Olympic bronze medalists for France
Olympic rowers of France
Rowers at the 1920 Summer Olympics
Olympic medalists in rowing
Medalists at the 1920 Summer Olympics
European Rowing Championships medalists
20th-century French people